The meridian 152° west of Greenwich is a line of longitude that extends from the North Pole across the Arctic Ocean, North America, the Pacific Ocean, the Southern Ocean, and Antarctica to the South Pole.

The 152nd meridian west forms a great circle with the 28th meridian east.

From Pole to Pole
Starting at the North Pole and heading south to the South Pole, the 152nd meridian west passes through:

{| class="wikitable plainrowheaders"
! scope="col" width="130" | Co-ordinates
! scope="col" | Country, territory or sea
! scope="col" | Notes
|-
| style="background:#b0e0e6;" | 
! scope="row" style="background:#b0e0e6;" | Arctic Ocean
| style="background:#b0e0e6;" |
|-
| style="background:#b0e0e6;" | 
! scope="row" style="background:#b0e0e6;" | Beaufort Sea
| style="background:#b0e0e6;" |
|-
| 
! scope="row" | 
| Alaska
|-
| style="background:#b0e0e6;" | 
! scope="row" style="background:#b0e0e6;" | Cook Inlet
| style="background:#b0e0e6;" |
|-
| 
! scope="row" | 
| Alaska — Kalgin Island
|-valign="top"
| style="background:#b0e0e6;" | 
! scope="row" style="background:#b0e0e6;" | Cook Inlet
| style="background:#b0e0e6;" | Passing just west of the Kenai Peninsula, Alaska,  (at )
|-
| 
! scope="row" | 
| Alaska — the Barren Islands
|-
| style="background:#b0e0e6;" | 
! scope="row" style="background:#b0e0e6;" | Pacific Ocean
| style="background:#b0e0e6;" |
|-
| 
! scope="row" | 
| Alaska — Afognak Island
|-valign="top"
| style="background:#b0e0e6;" | 
! scope="row" style="background:#b0e0e6;" | Pacific Ocean
| style="background:#b0e0e6;" | Passing just east of Kodiak Island, Alaska,  (at ) Passing just west of Flint Island,  (at ) Passing just west of Tupai atoll,  (at ) Passing just east of Maupiti atoll,  (at ) Passing just west of Bora Bora island,  (at )
|-
| style="background:#b0e0e6;" | 
! scope="row" style="background:#b0e0e6;" | Southern Ocean
| style="background:#b0e0e6;" |
|-valign="top"
| 
! scope="row" | Antarctica
| Ross Dependency, claimed by 
|}

See also
151st meridian west
153rd meridian west

w152 meridian west